Christian Haren (February 1, 1935 – February 27, 1996) was an American stage and screen actor, model and community activist.

Early life
Haren was born in San Bernardino County, California. He attended school and colleges in San Bernardino.  In his 20s he served in the United States Army during the 1950s.

Acting career
In the 1960s Haren received a studio contract from MGM and starred in Vincente Minnelli's Bells Are Ringing, Otto Preminger's In Harm's Way (a Paramount Pictures film), and Billy Rose's Jumbo.  He starred on Broadway in the Bertolt Brecht play The Resistible Rise of Arturo Ui, produced by Tony Richardson.

He is best remembered for playing the role of the Marlboro Man in print advertisements in the early 1960s, and appearing in print ads for Budweiser Beer.

Activism
Haren was openly gay, and was the proprietor of the popular Palm Springs gay bar CC Construction Co. in later years. In 1985, he was diagnosed with AIDS and became active in AIDS prevention education.  He started "The Wedge", a "safe sex" AIDS prevention organization for teens in San Francisco. After living with the disease for over a decade, Haren died in 1996. Five well-known Marlboro men died of smoking related illnesses. Haren and Darrell Winfield (21 years as the Marlboro Man) were the two best known of all of men who portrayed the Marlboro Man, but who did not suffer ill effects from smoking.

Death and legacy
Haren died in 1996 in San Francisco, California, of complications from AIDS, at the age of 61.

His life was the subject of the 1998 documentary short Castro Cowboy.

Filmography

References

External links

San Francisco Chronicle obituary
LA Times obituary

1935 births
1996 deaths
People from San Bernardino County, California
AIDS-related deaths in California
American gay actors
Gay models
Male models from California
20th-century American male actors
Metro-Goldwyn-Mayer contract players
20th-century American LGBT people